The Kwele people, or Bakwele, are a tribal group of eastern Gabon, Republic of the Congo, and Cameroons in Central Africa. They fled the coastal area of West Africa during the 19th century, after their traditional enemies acquired firearms from the slave traders. This altercation is often called the "Poupou" war. The Kwele then settled into lands between the Dja and Ivindo rivers. Their assumed five separate linguistic subgroups are identified by differences in where their community lies on a map, where they have migrated over time, political structure, performances implemented in rituals, and the communities cohesion within each.

The Kwele are noted for their ceremonial masks which are collected as art objects.

The masks are associated with the Beete association, which maintains social order, and are also used in initiation rites and at the end of mourning periods. Thought to represent benevolent forest spirits, the masks represent people or animals, or a combination of the two. Many lack open eye slits and the masks are shown rather than worn. Some of their masks are painted with white kaolin clay, which the Kwele associate with light and clarity.

In the beete ritual which they perform, there is a gorilla masked person (Gabon) as the opposition to the Ekuk mask.

External links
 
For spirits and kings: African art from the Paul and Ruth Tishman collection, an exhibition catalog from The Metropolitan Museum of Art Libraries (fully available online as PDF), which contains material on the Kwele people

References

Indigenous peoples of West Africa
Ethnic groups in Cameroon
Ethnic groups in Gabon
Ethnic groups in the Republic of the Congo
Tribal art